Wann may refer to:

Wann, Nebraska
Wann, Oklahoma
WANN-CD, a television station based in Atlanta, Georgia
WANN, the former call sign of radio station WBIS in Baltimore, Maryland
Wann Formation, a geologic formation in Kansas and Oklahoma
USS Walter C. Wann, a US Navy ship during World War II
Wann River, a tributary of Tagish Lake in northern Canada

People named Wann

Alpha Wann, member of French rap group 1995 (band)
Dennis Wann (born 1950), English footballer
Jim Wann, actor in musical Pump Boys and Dinettes
Keith Wann (born 1969), American actor and comedian
Marie Wann (1911–1996), American statistician
Marilyn Wann (born 1966), American author and fat acceptance activist
Norman G. Wann (1882–1957), American football player, track athlete, coach, and college athletics administrator
Sandy Wann (born 1940), Scottish footballer
Wann Rashidah (born 1970), a Malaysian singer